Hunan Police Academy is a university located in Changsha, Hunan, China.

As of fall 2013, the university has one campus, a combined student body of 5,000 students, 337 faculty members.

The university consists of 1 college and 7 departments, with 13 specialties for undergraduates. The university covers a total area of 700 mu, with more than 210,000 square meters of floor space.

As of 2021, Hunan Police Academy ranked first in Hunan and 17th nationwide among universities specialized in Political Science and Law in the recognized Best Chinese Universities Ranking.

History 
Hunan Police Academy was founded in September 1949, it was initially called "Hunan Provincial Public Security School".

On January 22, 2010, it renamed "Hunan Police Academy".

Academics 
 School of Police 
 Department of Investigation
 Department of Criminal Technology
 Department of Computer Engineering
 Department of Public Security 
 Department of Law
 Department of Traffic Management 
 Department of Public Administration

Library collections 
Hunan Police Academy's total collection amounts to more than 690,000 items.

Culture 
 Motto:

References

External links 
 

Universities and colleges in Hunan
Educational institutions established in 1949
Education in Changsha
1949 establishments in China
Universities and colleges in Changsha